James Henry Peters (24 October 1918 in Hackney, London – 9 January 1999 in Thorpe Bay, Essex) was a long-distance runner from England. He broke the world record for the men's marathon four times in the 1950s. He was the first runner to complete a marathon in under 2 hours 20 minutes – an achievement which was equated to the breaking of the four-minute mile. He achieved this at the Polytechnic Marathon of 1953, a point-to-point race from Windsor to Chiswick, West-London. Later the same year Peters set the first sub-2:20 clocking on an out-and-back course, at the Enschede Marathon in the Netherlands.
 
At the 1954 Vancouver Commonwealth Games he reached the stadium in first place, 17 minutes ahead of the next runner and 10 minutes ahead of the record, but collapsed repeatedly and failed to finish. After covering just 200 metres in 11 minutes, he was stretchered away and never raced again. "I was lucky not to have died that day", he later said. His games kit, including plimsolls and the special medal which following the games the Duke of Edinburgh sent to Jim inscribed "To a most gallant marathon runner." were given to the Sports Hall of Fame, Vancouver in 1967 for exhibition.

He served as president of the then recently formed Road Runners Club from 1955 - 1956. After retiring from competitive athletics, Peters worked as an optician in Mitcham, Surrey and Chadwell Heath, Essex.

Achievements

External links 
 Sporting Heroes 
 
 
 Frank Keating, The Guardian

1918 births
1999 deaths
People from Hackney Central
Athletes from London
English male marathon runners
Olympic athletes of Great Britain
Athletes (track and field) at the 1948 Summer Olympics
Athletes (track and field) at the 1952 Summer Olympics
Athletes (track and field) at the 1954 British Empire and Commonwealth Games
World record setters in athletics (track and field)
Commonwealth Games medallists in athletics
Commonwealth Games bronze medallists for England
Medallists at the 1954 British Empire and Commonwealth Games